League tables for teams participating in Kolmonen, the fourth tier of the Finnish soccer league system, in 2002.

League tables 2002

Helsinki and Uusimaa

Section 1

Section 2

Section 3

South-East Finland, Kaakkois-Suomi

Central Finland, Keski-Suomi

Eastern Finland, Itä-Suomi

Northern Finland, Pohjois-Suomi

Lappi 1

Lappi 2

Oulu

Central Ostrobothnia, Keski-Pohjanmaa

Vaasa

Not available

Satakunta

Tampere

Turku and Åland, Turku and Ahvenanmaa

Promotion Playoffs

Promotion Playoff Group A
EBK - FCK 1-2
FCK - FC Kontu 5-2
FC Kontu - EBK 3-0

Promotion Playoff Group B
EuPa - Ilves 2 – 1
Ilves - MaPS 1 – 2
MaPS - EuPa  6 – 1

Promotion Playoff Group C
SC KuFu-98 – FC Pantterit 2-2
JJK/2 – SC KuFu-98 0-5
FC Pantterit – JJK/2 6-1

Promotion Playoff Group D
FC YPA      - SIF              6 - 0
Tervarit II - FC YPA           1 - 3
SIF         - Tervarit II      1 - 4

Additional Playoff Matches
EuPa - FC Kontu 3-2
FC Kontu - EuPa 4-0
FC Kontu won 6-3 on aggregate and gained promotion

Tervarit II - SC KuFu-98 6-1 (0-1, 1-1)

Footnotes

References and sources
Finnish FA
ResultCode

Kolmonen seasons
4
Finland
Finland